Richard Preston Wilkerson Jr. (born March 28, 1984) and his wife DawnCheré are the pastors of Vous Church in Miami, Florida.

Wilkerson is the son of the Robyn and Rich Wilkerson Sr, who run Trinity Church, a megachurch in Miami that is part of the Assemblies of God; Wilkerson Sr is a cousin of David Wilkerson, who wrote The Cross and the Switchblade.

Vous was spun out of Trinity in 2015; it started as a young adult and youth ministry program within Trinity called The Rendezvous, later shortened to The Vous.  Vous incorporates elements of contemporary popular culture, as other ministries aimed at young people have done in the past.

In 2014 Wilkerson officiated at the marriage of Kim Kardashian and Kanye West; Kanye had first come to a Vous service after being invited by Chris Julian, who co-owns  LeBron James's Miami boutique where Kanye shopped, and who attended Trinity.  The press coverage of the wedding led to Wilkerson and DawnCheré becoming household names.  The Oxygen television network created a reality show called "Rich In Faith" centered on the couple that ran for ten episodes in 2015 and 2016.

In 2015 Wilkerson released a book called Sandcastle Kings with artwork by Kanye West, in 2018 he released a book called Friend of Sinners: Why Jesus Cares More About Relationship Than Perfection., and in 2022 he released his third book called Single and Secure.

References

External links
Rich Wilkerson Jr. church website at The Vous

1984 births
Living people
American evangelists
Assemblies of God people